Thingou railway station is a railway station in Tamenglong district, Manipur. Its code is TGBP. It serves Thingou village of Nungba sub-division. The station proposal includes two platforms. The work on this rail line is expected to be finished year 2019.

References

Railway stations in Imphal East district
Lumding railway division
Proposed railway stations in India